Geopyxis korfii is a species of cup fungus in the family Pyronemataceae. Found in Qinghai, China, it was described as new to science in 2006 by Wen-Ying Zhang. It is the only species of Geopyxis with ornamented ascospores.

References

External links

Fungi described in 2006
Fungi of China
Pyronemataceae